The Batcave is a subterranean location appearing in American comic books published by DC Comics. It is the headquarters of the superhero Batman, whose secret identity is Bruce Wayne and his partners, consisting of caves beneath his personal residence, Wayne Manor.

Publication history
Originally, there was only a secret tunnel that ran underground between Wayne Manor and a dusty old barn where the Batmobile was kept. Later, in Batman #12 (August–September 1942), Bill Finger mentioned "secret underground hangars". In 1943, the writers of the first Batman film serial, titled Batman, gave Batman a complete underground crime lab and introduced it in the second chapter entitled "The Bat's Cave". The entrance was via a secret passage through a grandfather clock and included bats flying around.

Bob Kane, who was on the film set, mentioned this to Bill Finger who was going to be the initial scripter on the Batman daily newspaper strip. Finger included with his script a clipping from Popular Mechanics that featured a detailed cross-section of underground hangars. Kane used this clipping as a guide, adding a study, crime lab, workshop, hangar and garage. This illustration appeared in the Batman "dailies" on October 29, 1943, in a strip entitled "The Bat Cave!"

In this early version the cave itself was described as Batman's underground study and, like the other rooms, was just a small alcove with a desk and filing cabinets. Like in the film serial, Batman's symbol was carved into the rock behind the desk and had a candle in the middle of it. The entrance was via a bookcase which led to a secret elevator.

The Batcave made its comic book debut in Detective Comics #83 in January 1944. Over the decades, the cave has expanded along with its owner's popularity to include a vast trophy room, supercomputer, and forensics lab. There has been little consistency as to the floor plan of the Batcave or its contents. The design has varied from artist to artist and it is not unusual for the same artist to draw the cave layout differently in various issues.

Fictional history

The cave was discovered and used long before by Bruce Wayne's ancestors as a storehouse as well as a means of transporting escaped slaves during the Civil War era. The 18th-century frontier hero Tomahawk once discovered a gargantuan bat belonging to Morgaine le Fey inside what can be assumed would become the Batcave. Wayne himself rediscovered the caves as a boy when he fell through a dilapidated well on his estate, but did not consider it as a potential base of operations until returning to Gotham to become Batman. In addition to a base, the Batcave serves as a place of privacy and tranquility, much like Superman's Fortress of Solitude.

In earlier versions of the story, Bruce Wayne discovered the cave as an adult. In "The Origin of the Batcave" in Detective Comics #205 (March 1954), Batman tells Robin he had no idea the cave existed when he purchased the house they live in. He discovered the cave by accident when testing the floor of an old barn on the rear of the property, and the floor gave way. This story also established that a frontiersman named Jeremy Coe used the cave as a headquarters 300 years earlier. Bruce Wayne discovering the cave as an adult remained the case at least through Who's Who #2 in 1985.

Upon his initial foray into crime-fighting, Wayne used the caves as a sanctum and to store his then-minimal equipment. As time went on, Wayne found the place ideal to create a stronghold for his war against crime, and has incorporated a plethora of equipment as well as expanding the cave for specific uses.

Access

The cave is accessible in several ways. It can be reached through a secret door in Wayne Manor itself, which is almost always depicted as in the main study, often behind a grandfather clock which unlocks when the hands are set to the time that Bruce Wayne's parents were murdered, 10:48 pm. In the 1960s Batman TV show, the cave entrance is behind a bookcase which was opened when Bruce Wayne activated a control switch hidden in a bust of William Shakespeare. An entrance under Bruce Wayne's chair in his office in Wayne Enterprises, as shown in Batman Forever, connects to a mile-long tunnel that Bruce travels through in a high-speed personal transportation capsule. In Batman Begins and The Dark Knight Rises, the cave is accessible through a secret door disguised as part of a large display case and is unlocked by pressing a sequence of keys on the nearby grand piano.

Another secret entrance, covered by a waterfall, pond, hologram, or a camouflaged door, allows access to a service road for the Batmobile. Another alternate entrance is the dry well where Bruce originally discovered the Batcave, highlighted especially during the Knightfall comic book storyline. At one point, Dick Grayson and Tim Drake use the dry well to get into the cave, which they had been locked out of by Azrael during his time as Batman, and Bruce Wayne used it to infiltrate the cave and confront the insane Valley in the final battle between the two men for the title of the Batman. Lured into the narrow tunnel, Valley was forced to remove the massive Bat-armor he had developed, thus allowing Wayne to force Valley to remit his claim to the title.

The location of the cave is known not only to Batman but to several of his allies. In addition to the so-called "Batman Family", members of the Justice League and the original Outsiders are aware of the cave's location. Essentially, anyone who is aware of Batman's secret identity also knows the location of the Batcave, much like how people who have knowledge of Robin's identity have knowledge of Batman's; these, unfortunately, include such villains as Ra's al Ghul, who makes occasional visits to the Batcave to confront his long-time nemesis, and David Cain, who infiltrated the cave during the Bruce Wayne: Fugitive comic book storyline when he framed Bruce Wayne for murder. During Batman: Dark Victory, Two-Face, the Joker, Mr. Freeze and Poison Ivy discovered the Batcave while fleeing through the sewers to escape the attacks of the surviving mobsters, but they had lost their way and were never able to find the cave again after being defeated, with Batman reflecting that he would seal that entrance to prevent such a thing happening again. When the powerful Bedlam took over the world and transferred all adults to a duplicate Earth, Robin attempted to assess the situation from the Batcave with Superboy and Impulse, but it would appear that he avoided revealing the cave's exact location to them, suggesting that he accessed it via an external passage or a teleporter.

Although Wayne Manor was repossessed and converted into the new Arkham Asylum following the events of Batman Eternal, Batman maintains the original cave after sealing off the entrance to Wayne Manor, musing that it is a good opportunity to keep his foes contained. After the manor was gifted back to Bruce by Geri Powers, Alfred kept the location of the Batcave a secret from Bruce who had lost his memory of being Batman in his last battle with The Joker. While the manor was being renovated and all the Arkham inmates were removed Bruce and Alfred until then remained in a Brownstone in Gotham itself. Even after Bruce loses all memory of his life as Batman, the cave was still used by other members of the Bat-Family; Alfred took the de-powered Clark Kent to the cave to explain what had happened to Bruce, and Dick Grayson and the various Robins used it as a base of operations while opposing the schemes of the ruthless "Mother" in Batman and Robin Eternal. When new villain Mr. Bloom launches a massive attack on Gotham, Alfred is forced to allow Bruce into the Batcave to access an apparently-disregarded program designed to upload Bruce's memories to a series of Batman clones to maintain his legacy, Bruce overcoming the original project's limitation of being unable to upload the memories to a fresh body by having Alfred take him to the point of brain death and then download the data onto his blank brain.

Design
The Batcave serves as Batman's secret headquarters and the command center, where he monitors all crisis points in Gotham City, as well as the rest of the world.

The cave's centerpiece is a supercomputer whose specs are on par with any of those used by leading national security agencies; it permits global surveillance and also connects to a massive information network as well as storing vast amounts of information. A series of satellite link-ups allows easy access to Batman's information network anywhere around the globe. The systems are protected against unauthorized access, and any attempt to breach their security immediately sends an alert to Batman or Oracle. Despite the power of Batman's computers, the Justice League Watchtower is known to have more powerful computers, and Batman does occasionally use them if he feels his computers are not up to the task; on occasion, he also consults Oracle for assistance.

Additionally, the cave features state-of-the-art facilities such as a crime lab, various specialized laboratories, mechanized workshops, personal gymnasium, parking, docking and hangar space for his vehicles as well as separate exits for each type, memorabilia of past campaigns, a vast library, a large bat colony, and a Justice League teleporter. It also has medical facilities as well as various areas used in training exercises for Batman and his allies.

The cave houses Batman's vast array of specialized vehicles, foremost being the Batmobile in all its incarnations. Other vehicles within the complex include various motorcycles, air- and watercraft such as the Batplane, a single-occupant supersonic jet, and the Subway Rocket.

The cave is sometimes depicted as being powered by a nuclear reactor, but most often by a hydroelectric generator made possible by an underground river.

During the Cataclysm storyline, the cave was seriously damaged in an earthquake, with the Bat-family relocating most of the trophies and equipment in the cave to offsite storage to conceal Batman's identity. During the later reconstruction, the new Wayne Manor incorporates additional safeguards against future quakes and even a potential nuclear catastrophe, outfitting the cave as a virtual bomb shelter or an enhanced panic room. The city's earthquake redesigned the caverns of the Batcave, with eight new levels now making up Batman's secret refuge of high-tech laboratory, library, training areas, storage areas, and vehicle accesses. It also includes an "island" computer platform (built on the spot where the Batmobiles' hydraulic turntable once was) with seven linked Cray T932 mainframes and a state-of-the-art hologram projector. There's also a selection of retractable glass maps within the computer platform. Kevlar shieldings are prepared to protect the cave's computer systems from seismic activity. With the cave's various facilities spread amid limestone stalactites and stalagmites, Batman built retractable multi-walkway bridges, stairs, elevators, and poles to access its facilities.

There is a containment vault solely for Lex Luthor's Kryptonite ring. However, it was later revealed that Batman built another containment facility within the cave for a variety of forms of Kryptonite.

What is allegedly the world's last Lazarus Pit was constructed inside the cave, although this has been contradicted by events in the pages of Batgirl and the Black Adam miniseries.

Security measures
The Batcave is rigged with a sophisticated security system to prevent all measure of infiltration. The security measures include motion sensors, silent alarms, steel and lead mechanical doors which could lock a person in or out, and a security mode which is specifically designed to stop if not eliminate all Justice League members in the event that any of them go rogue.

After Bruce Wayne's 'death' during the Final Crisis, Two-Face managed to infiltrate the cave with the aid of a psychic analyzing a batarang to 'sense' where it was forged and then hiring Warp to teleport him into it, something that Two-Face had never been able to do before as Batman used various spells and equipment to shield the cave which his allies either never knew about or had discontinued as they no longer used the cave themselves following Bruce's death. Despite Two-Face successfully breaking into the cave, Dick Grayson, acting as the new Batman, is able to convince Dent that he is the same man and has just adopted new methods, preserving Batman's secrets as Dent is rendered unconscious before he can find the location of the cave.

Memorabilia

The cave stores unique memorabilia items collected from the various cases Batman has worked on over the years. Originally, these were stored in a room designed just for them; it was explained that Batman and Robin took one memento from each case. Later, the trophies were shown to be in the large main area of the cave, residing among the rest of the Batcave's furnishings.

The most regularly featured trophies are a full-size animatronic Tyrannosaurus Rex, a giant replica of a Lincoln penny, and an oversized Joker playing card. The T. Rex comes from an adventure on "Dinosaur Island" (Batman #35 1946); the penny was originally a trophy from Batman's encounter with a penny-obsessed villain named the Penny Plunderer (World's Finest Comics #30 1947), but was later retconned into being from an encounter with Two-Face.  Other "keepsakes" in the cave come from "The Thousand and One Trophies of Batman!" (Detective Comics #158, 1950). These three stories were reprinted in Batman #256.

Modern retellings of the items' origins can be found in Batman Chronicles stories in issue #8 ("Secrets of the Batcave: Dinosaur Island") and issue #19 ("The Penny Plunderers").

A story in Batman #81 featured Two-Face tying Batman and Robin to a giant replica of his silver dollar coin. This story was the basis for an episode of Batman: The Animated Series wherein Batman gains the giant coin from that encounter; this has caused widespread confusion as to the actual origin of the coin trophy.

Other pieces often shown in the Batcave are Two-Face's original coin, Deathstroke's sword, the shroud of the vampiric Monk, and oversized ten-pins.

There is also a glass case display of Jason Todd's Robin costume as a memorial to him, with the epitaph "A Good Soldier", which remains even after Todd's resurrection. Barbara Gordon's Batgirl costume also remains on display. In the Dark Horse two-part crossover, Grendel/Batman II, Hunter Rose's skull is also put on display in the memorabilia room.

After the Flashpoint comic book storyline, a letter written by a Thomas Wayne from an alternate timeline addressed to Bruce Wayne has lain in a display case, as a reminder of Thomas Wayne's love for his son and encouraging him to move on from his tragic past. However, this letter was destroyed by the reborn Eobard Thawne as a way to hurt Bruce for Thomas's attempt to kill him before Flashpoint ended.

"Batcave" safehouses

The Outsiders were, for a time, based out of a Batcave in Los Angeles. When Jean Paul Valley took over the role of Batman, Tim Drake establishes his own safe house using an abandoned barn nearby Wayne Manor and his own house. After Bane's attack during the Knightfall story arc, Bruce Wayne swore that he'd never be caught unprepared to defend Gotham City ever again. When Dick Grayson assumed the Batman role during the Prodigal storyline, Bruce established satellite Batcaves throughout the city on areas either owned by him, his company, or unknown or abandoned by the city, in the event that he needed a place to hide and/or resupply, which were pivotal during the No Man's Land storyline. One such Batcave was given to Batgirl, below a house owned by Bruce Wayne himself, during a point where her identity was compromised after she saved a man from rogue government agents, meaning that she could not walk around without a mask.

Bat Bunker: Under the Wayne Foundation building, there is a secret bunker. As of Batman #687, Dick Grayson has taken to using this as his "Batcave", stating that he wishes to embody the role of Batman in a way that is specific to him as well as getting closer to the action in the city. The bunker is as well-equipped as the original Batcave, including the Subway Rocket vehiclr.

The other satellite Batcaves introduced during No Man's Land were:

Batcave Central: Located fifty feet below the bottom of Robinson Park Reservoir, it is accessible through a secret entrance at the foot of one of the Twelve Caesars statues at the north of the park. This safehouse was put out of commission by Poison Ivy, her "Feraks", and Clayface.
Batcave South: A boiler room of a derelict shipping yard on the docks across from Paris Island. This safehouse is accessible through a number of false manholes planted throughout Old Gotham streets.
Batcave South-Central: Located in the Old Gotham prototype subway station, a four-block stretch of track sealed in 1896 and forgotten.
Batcave Northwest: This safehouse is located in the subbasement of Arkham Asylum. Batman secretly stocked it with emergency rations, all-terrain vehicles, and battery-powered communication equipment.
Batcave East: An abandoned oil refinery owned by Wayne Enterprises. It fell out of use during a gasoline crisis when the company moved all of its holdings offshore decades ago.
Batcave Submarine: Introduced in 2002's Fugitive story arc, this time in the form of an abandoned submarine docked on the city's harbors, which Batman used as a full-time residence when he chose to abandon his life as Bruce Wayne when framed for the murder of Vesper Fairchild.

Alternative versions of the Batcave

Batman & Dracula Trilogy
In Batman & Dracula: Red Rain, Batman destroys the Batcave to eliminate Dracula's followers; having lured them into the cave after a prolonged pursuit through the sewers, he sets off explosive charges to destroy the Batcave's walls at the moment the sun rises, destroying the vampires trapped within it, before setting off additional charges to collapse Wayne Manor to preserve his secrets. The first sequel, Bloodstorm, shows that a cellar beneath a brownstone owned by Alfred Pennyworth serves as a lair/laboratory for Batman after he has become a vampire himself, the Dark Knight 'sleeping' there in his coffin during the day. Although Wayne Manor collapses into the remains of the cave, part of the tunnel system is still intact, with Batman establishing his lair there in the story's second sequel, Crimson Mist, after he surrenders to his new vampire instincts. Despite the collapse of the manor, the cave interior appears mostly intact, with the giant penny, the T-Rex and the Batmobile shown to be undamaged, although there is also a deep chasm within walking distance of the areas where Batman kept the aforementioned items when he was human. At the story's conclusion, Commissioner Gordon sets off explosive charges to destroy the cave's roof, letting the sun into the cave once again to destroy the monster that Batman has become once and for all.

Batman: Brotherhood of the Bat
In Batman: Brotherhood of the Bat, some years after Bruce Wayne's death and humanity's decimation by a virus unleashed by Ra's al Ghul, Ra's takes control of the Batcave and uses some of Bruce's sketches of possible costumes to create an army of Bat-men based on Bruce's rejected costume designs. Eventually, this 'Brotherhood' is infiltrated by Tallant, the son of Bruce Wayne and Talia al Ghul, who is able to destroy the Brotherhood from within using his father's own costume, culminating in him defeating his grandfather in a duel in the cave.

Flashpoint (comics)
In the alternate reality of Flashpoint, the Batcave- here used by Thomas Wayne rather than Bruce- is far smaller and more run-down than the traditional version, containing merely a couple of tables for Thomas to work on his equipment and a medical area, with a conventional computer in the upper manor, reflecting Thomas's more brutal and solitary M.O. as Batman as opposed to the more sophisticated training undertaken by his son.

Legion of Super-Heroes
In the 31st century, the Batcave has been long abandoned, although Cosmic Boy, Saturn Girl and Lightning Lad briefly infiltrate the cave while looking for evidence that Krypton existed to counter the xenophobic claims of the Justice League of Earth that Superman was a human given powers to fight against aliens.

Detective Comics (vol. 2) #27
In a possible future, Bruce Wayne has used a machine to download his memories and training into a series of clones of himself, each one aged to a point where they can act as Batman for around twenty-five years before they need to activate the new clone. By the time that the tenth generation clone is created, the Batcave has become a vast workshop, including a flying Batmobile, a robotic shark as a trophy, and costumes in glass cases, but the older Batman informs the new one that the contents of the cave will be burned upon his death so that the new Batman can make room for his own things while using the recorded memories to keep track of anything important from the past.

Smallville: Season 11
In the comic book continuation of the television series Smallville, Batman has a safe house in the form of a cargo ship, known as "Leviathan", docked at a hub in Metropolis. It is registered to a shell corporation in the Caribbean, thus protecting Bruce Wayne's secret. However, it is compromised by the Intergang, Prankster, and Mister Freeze. Lex Luthor is also aware of Leviathan's location due to his tracking of Superman's radiation signature with his satellites. Wayne is later shown in the Batcave itself with Alfred when the Martian Manhunter infiltrates it to talk with Batman.

Batman Beyond
In the comic book series Batman Beyond 2.0, Terry no longer uses the Batcave following an argument with Bruce. He now uses Dick Grayson's apartment as his base of operations. When Terry is seriously injured in a battle with Rewire, he wakes up in the Batcave where Bruce has treated his injuries and left information regarding Rewire himself. He arrived there due to a built in subroutine in the suit that if the user is seriously injured or falls unconscious, the suit becomes automated and returns the user to the Batcave.

After arriving in the universe controlled by the Justice Lords Terry encounters a version of himself who is a member of the Jokerz known as " T ". Both McGinnis's arrive at Wayne Manor to find that it had been destroyed by the Justice Lords. A gang of Jokerz then proceed to attack them with T giving Terry enough time to make his way to the badly damaged Batcave. After exploring the cave he finds a number of damaged display cases which contain an unknown Batgirl suit, Justice Lord Batman suit and a Red Robin suit. He then discovers an armored and more powerful version of his own Batsuit which is powered by synthetic Kryptonite. After defeating the Jokerz gang he is confronted by Justice Lord Superman.

Following the defeat of Lord Superman, T and Dick Grayson of the Justice Lords universe begin repairs to the Batcave and to the suit Terry found with the intention of T taking over as the new Batman and Dick becoming his mentor. They later help send Terry back to his own universe.

In other media

Film

Serials
The Batcave first became part of the Batman mythos in the 1943 15-chapter movie serial Batman starring Lewis Wilson. In this version, as later in the comics, it was a small cave with a desk and rock walls lit up by candles. Behind the desk is a large black bat symbol. The cave is connected to a crime lab. Bats were depicted as flying around the cave, although only their shadows were visible. Batman uses these bats as a scare tactic to make an apprehended enemy reveal information. To prevent the enemy from escaping, an iron door covers the exit.

The Batcave was also featured and expanded on in the 1949 serial Batman and Robin starring Robert Lowery. In this serial, there are filing cabinets and the cave now has a crime lab built in. The cave also contains the first incarnation of a batphone.

In both serials, the cave is accessed by walking through a grandfather clock.

Batman (TV series)

The 1960s live-action Batman TV series featured the Batcave extensively, and portrayed it as a large but well-lit cavern containing an atomic power generator, a chemistry lab, punch-card computers, and other electronic crime-fighting devices, almost always prominently labeled with their function. In this incarnation, it primarily served as a crime lab and garage for the Batmobile. In this version, the Batcave is accessed from Wayne Manor via two Bat-Poles (one marked BRUCE and the other marked DICK), which are hidden behind a bookcase that can be opened by turning a switch hidden inside a bust of Shakespeare. When Bruce and Dick slide down these Bat-Poles, they are instantly outfitted in their costumes before reaching the landing pads at the bottom. The Bat-Poles can also be used to lift Bruce and Dick up from the Batcave to Wayne Manor by use of the steamjet-propelled landing pads. The Batcave is also accessible via a service elevator used by Alfred.

Tim Burton/Joel Schumacher films

Batman (1989)

The cave is present in Tim Burton's 1989 Batman feature film. The cave is shown to house the Batmobile, which is parked on a turntable-like platform at the edge of a large chasm filled with pipes, looking somewhat like a sewer. The Batmoblie enters the cave from a rock cliff/door. A huge switch turns on the lights in the cave. There are also bats roaming the cave. The cave also features the Batcomputer, which is on a metal platform. There is also an office-like workstation, some unspecified machinery and a large vault for Batman's costume.

Batman Returns (1992)

The cave is once again seen in Batman Returns, and Bruce gains access to it via a tube/elevator like passage from Wayne Manor, the entrance to which is hidden in an iron maiden, and is activated by flipping a small switch hidden on a small replica of Wayne Manor in the bottom of a fish tank. Alfred also confirms, in a throwaway remark, that there is a staircase to the cave. The cave was huge and well lit and featured a forensics lab, a computer, unspecified machines, a closet for the costumes, the Batmobile, and its repair tools.

Batman Forever (1995)

In this film, the Batcave is accessed through a rotating shelf which led to a staircase in Wayne Manor's silver closet, the only room in the mansion that is kept locked. The cave can also be reached via a secret tunnel system from Bruce Wayne's office at Wayne Enterprises, through which he rides down in a capsule. The capsule has a communication device Bruce used to communicate with Alfred. The cave features the main computer, as well as a crime lab and canal, the latter of which provides sea access. The cave also includes a lengthy tunnel used to launch the Batwing, a rotating turntable that houses the Batmobile, and a large dome-like structure where Bruce's Batsuits and gadgets are stored.

During an invasion of Wayne Manor by Riddler and Two Face, Riddler destroys the Batcomputer, the crime lab, every Batsuit except for a prototype with a new sonar system, and the Batmobile, although there is a lower section containing the Batboat and the Batplane that Batman and the new Robin use to confront the villains. In the deleted scenes, the Batcave has a secret section that Bruce fell as a child during the funeral of their parents. After Riddler's attack, Bruce and Alfred come to that place where Bruce fell back to where finding the diary of his father and confronting his biggest fear; the giant bat.

Batman & Robin (1997)

This incarnation of the cave features a multitude of flashing lights, mostly in neon. On the whole, this Batcave is similar to that in Batman Forever, only more garish in its decoration. A capsule containing Robin's Redbird motorcycle rises out of the floor, and a long tunnel lined with neon lights leads out of the cave. The turntable holding the batmobile returns, but in a more elaborate fashion. The cave features the area used to store Batman's costume and a place to store Robin's.

The Dark Knight Trilogy

Batman Begins

In Batman Begins, the cave is still unfurnished, and the only things inside are a small workshop and a storage space for the Batsuit and its accessories, a medical area, and the Batmobile. The entrance and exit for the Batmobile are on a cliff, behind a waterfall. Alfred reveals to Bruce that during the Civil War, the Waynes used the vast cavern system as part of the Underground Railroad: after initially abseiling down a well to get into the cave, they discover a hidden Civil War-era mechanical elevator which is still functional and leads to a hidden entrance in the mansion, which they then use as the primary means of entrance to the cave. The elevator is accessed by tapping three keys on a piano. Near the end of the film, when Bruce talks to Alfred about rebuilding the burnt-down main section of Wayne Manor, Alfred suggests they "improve the foundation", which may mean improving and furnishing the cave as they rebuild the mansion.

The Dark Knight

As Wayne Manor is still under construction in The Dark Knight, Batman's base of operations has been relocated to a large bunker beneath a shipping yard. One access point shown is through a shipping container which houses a secret hydraulic lift. The "Bat-bunker" also contains a wire mesh cage for the Batsuit, along with the associated weapons and tools, toolbox, and spare equipment for the Batmobile. In contrast to the Batcave, the large rectangular shaped room is brightly lit by banks of overhead fluorescent lights. Storage areas for the equipment are located both under the ground and within the walls giving the room a very empty appearance with the exception of a large bank of monitors to go with a well-developed computer system. In addition, the room is equipped with furnaces which Alfred uses to burn documents after Bruce decides to turn himself in.

The Dark Knight Rises

The Batcave reappears in The Dark Knight Rises in full working condition. To access the cave, a similar way to Batman Begins, tapping three keys on the piano will reveal a now modernly built elevator which takes the passenger straight to the cave. The newest addition to the cave is "The Bat", a flying tank aircraft built by Wayne Enterprises' Applied Science Division and a Batcomputer as well as numerous landing pads and a locking case which contains the Batsuit. Added features included that the bridges used to gain access to different sections can be submerged as well as the platforms as a form of security measures in case anyone gains unauthorized access to the cave. While submerged the only visible object is a Batcomputer terminal which can only be accessed by either Bruce or Alfred's fingerprints and an access code. The cave from The Dark Knight appears as well, which contains weapons, supplies, and a back-up Batsuit. After Bruce Wayne is declared legally dead, his will is amended so that John Blake inherits GPS coordinates that lead him to the Batcave.

DC Extended Universe

Batman v Superman: Dawn of Justice

In this version, the Batcave is not located directly underneath Wayne Manor, but was originally in the woods on the manor's outskirts, with Bruce discovering the cave when he fell into them after running away during his parents' funeral. After Wayne Manor was destroyed in some unspecified fire, Bruce and Alfred relocated to a glass house built above the Batcave, which consists primarily of a long access passage that leads to a nearby lake and can be used for the Batmobile or (presumably) the Batplane to gain access. The elevator leading to the house also includes a chamber with an old Robin costume, apparently a memorial, while an upper level includes the Batcomputer and a workshop where Bruce and Alfred can work on Batman's various weapons, including the synthesiser used to distort his voice in the regular suit and the armour he uses to fight Superman.

Justice League

Following Superman's death, Bruce continues to operate out of the Batcave, which it is revealed also includes a large hangar where he has been working on a secret troop transport for the team he has been planning to create following Superman's death. As he works on the transport, he is visited by Diana, and notes that the cave's security cost him millions of dollars. Once the team of himself, Diana, Barry Allen, Victor Stone and Arthur Curry have come together for the first time to confront the powerful Steppenwolf, Bruce takes them to the Batcave to plan their next move, with an excited Barry Allen running all around the cave in seconds upon arrival.

The Batman franchise

The Batman (2021)

A new version of the Batcave appears in The Batman. The Batcave is an old Wayne Terminus railway station into his hidden headquarters, accessed through a series of secret tunnels underneath Wayne Tower.

The Lego Batman Movie

The Batcave is featured in The Lego Batman Movie. This version of the Batcave is more larger as it contains many versions of the Batmobile, Bat-themed vehicles and Batsuits.

It is controlled by Batman's sentient, HAL-9000-like, Batcomputer (voiced by Siri), nicknamed 'Puter', who, as Batman enters the Batcave through a secret road on Wayne Island, asks him the password, which is "Iron Man sucks".

Television

Early appearances
The Bat-Cave was first seen in animation in episodes of The Batman/Superman Hour, Super Friends, and The New Adventures of Batman. In these cartoons, the Batcomputer is present as usual. The voice of the Batcomputer was portrayed by Lou Scheimer in The New Adventures of Batman.

DC Animated Universe

Batman: The Animated Series
In the Batman: The Animated Series episode "Beware the Gray Ghost", the Batcave is revealed to be an exact replica of the lair used by the Gray Ghost, a fiction-within-fiction character and idol to Bruce Wayne.  There's also an exhibit of a collection of the Gray Ghost merchandise Bruce Wayne has collected since childhood. The Batcave gets introduced in this series as a large cavern. Bats are seen flying freely in the cave, with large naturally elevated platforms on which Robin practices his balance. Batman's numerous crime-fighting vehicles are seen parked in an adjacent compartment to the Batcave, with an adjoining not-so-secret subterranean garage which stores Bruce Wayne's mammoth collection of vintage and luxury cars.

In the episode "Almost Got 'Im", Two-Face uses a giant penny in an attempt to either crush Batman or kill him from the impact, depending on whichever side the giant coin landed on. Batman managed to free himself from the coin by slicing open the ropes. While telling the story of this to other Batman villains, Two-Face commented that Batman got to keep the giant coin.

Several entrances to the cave are seen throughout the series. In early episodes, Batman is seen using an elevator that is accessed through a secret door hidden behind a bookcase. In later episodes, he is seen using the classic grandfather clock entrance from the comics. In certain episodes, the clock-entrance is opened by setting the hands of the clock the time Bruce's parents were killed, while in The New Batman Adventures, Batman Beyond, and Justice League, the pendulum is pulled from behind the face of the clock to unlock the entrance.

The New Batman Adventures
In the episode "Mean Seasons" from The New Batman Adventures, Batman and Batgirl fight a giant mechanical T-Rex. The comic book tie-in to the Justice League Batman – Batman Adventures #12 – features a short called "The Hidden Display" which tells how a young Dick Grayson persuades Batman into keeping a robot T-Rex early on his career, which eventually leads to the Trophy Room of the Cave. Either one of these tales could be how the animated Batman obtained the dinosaur. An extensive training area allows Barbara Gordon to take on robots as part of her training.

Batman Beyond
This future Batcave of Batman Beyond houses replicas of Batman's enemies (both as wax dummies and robot combat trainers), and a display case with the many permutations of costumes of Robin, Batgirl, Nightwing, and Batman himself. Other items which have been shown to be in the Cave include the Freeze Gun and helmet of Mr. Freeze, the puppet Scarface, a 'shrine' to Bruce Wayne's childhood TV hero, the Gray Ghost, and the costumes of Harley Quinn, Penguin, Riddler, Mad Hatter, Firefly, and Catwoman. During the series, Bruce typically remained in the Batcave to coordinate Terry's efforts over the suit's video-link, giving him information and/or offering advice, although he would enter the field if the situation desperately called for it.

Justice League

In the Justice League animated series, the members of the League seek refuge in the Batcave during the Thanagarian invasion. Later, they also confront Hawkgirl in the cave, and use the Batcomputer to track her. Later, the Batcave is attacked by the Thanagarians, which the League fend off.

The Batman

The Batman features a much more high-tech Batcave, with large computer displays and flashing blue lights. Among these displays are the "Bat-Wave" warning signals, an alternate way of calling upon the Caped Crusader before the Bat-Signal went into service. As a throwback to the 1960s Batman series, the cave has assorted 'Bat-poles' for Batman and Robin which allow them to traverse faster. Additionally, the episode "Joker's Express" reveals that the Batcave is also connected to some old mines beneath the city that were created during its past as a coal-mining town in the late 1800s.

In the episode "Artifacts", archaeologists from the future unearth the Batcave. Its titanium supports are printed with binary code, as the computer information would not survive that long. The archaeologists theorize that Thomas Wayne was Batman and that Bruce Wayne was Robin. In another segment of the episode, set in 2027, Barbara Gordon (as Oracle) is shown at the Batcomputer in the Batcave. The archaeologists also uncover her wheelchair, and believe that Alfred used it.

Unlike many other incarnations of the Batcave which only have one exit/entrance, the Batmobile and other vehicles exit the cave through a variety of concealed dead-ends and disguised construction sites scattered around Gotham City. Batman also established a series of satellite Batcaves across Gotham.

Batman: The Brave and the Bold

The Batcave appears in Batman: The Brave and the Bold. This version displays numerous trophies that reference the 1960s Batman series, namely a giant clam and large slot-machine-themed electric chair. Additionally, a future version appears in "The Last Bat on Earth!", where a group of humanoid "Man-Bats" live in it and are driven out by Batman and Kamandi.

In "Menace of the Conqueror Caveman!", Booster Gold mentions that the Batcave will be converted into a historical attraction with its own built-in roller coaster in the 25th century.

Teen Titans 

In the episode "Haunted", the Batcave makes an appearance when Raven enters Robin's mind.

Young Justice 

In the episode "Downtime", Alfred and Bruce Wayne are both seen in the Batcave observing Robin's behavior.

Beware the Batman  

In this version, the entrance to the Bat Cave is hidden behind a large fireplace in Wayne's trophy room. Batman brings unconscious guests in, such as Man-Bat and Manhunter, for questioning. In the season finale, Deathstroke infiltrates the Batcave, takes Alfred hostage, and sets up explosives to destroy the Batcave and everyone in it. Batman has a climatic final showdown against Deathstroke, while Katana, Oracle, Metamorpho, and Man-Bat spread out to take down and dispose of the explosives.

Batwoman

In the TV series Batwoman, Bruce has a Batcave in Wayne Towers which is use by his cousin Kate and Luke Fox.

Titans

The Batcave appears in Titans.

Video games
Also in the 2008 video game Mortal Kombat vs. DC Universe, the Batcave is one of the fighting arenas.

Injustice
In the video game Injustice: Gods Among Us, the Batcave is a level in the game, where the fighters can use Batman's various weapons and vehicles to damage their opponent; Green Arrow faces a villainous Wonder Woman and Black Adam in the Batcave when attempting to acquire a Kryptonite weapon to defeat the corrupted Superman of an alternate reality, and the 'true' Batman faces the alternate Batman in a fight in the Batcave to convince him to go along with the plan of summoning the Superman of their world to defeat the villainous alternate Superman.

A new version of the Batcave appears as a level in Injustice 2. This version was originally the Gotham Underground Subway built by Bruce's great-grandfather. It's also where Bruce keeps his communications and surveillance hub, Brother Eye. It is currently unknown if Batman reclaimed the original Batcave and Wayne Manor after the fall of Superman and The Regime.

Lego Batman

The Batcave is also featured in the 2012 video game Lego Batman 2: DC Superheroes which features three parking 'areas' for land, sea and air based vehicles and their appropriate exits from the cave, the Batcomputer, used to replay past levels and 'warp' to various landmarks in Gotham and other elements shown in Batman media such as a waterfall, a Lincoln Penny and an animatronic T-Rex.

Batman: Arkham

In the 2009 video game Batman: Arkham Asylum, Batman can access a secret auxiliary Batcave hidden within the cave system beneath Arkham Island after the Joker takes control of the asylum. This Batcave is small and fairly spartan compared to its comic counterpart, containing only two small platforms, a Batcomputer, and one of Batman's Batwing planes. Near the end of the game this cave was partially destroyed by Poison Ivy.

Although not featured in the main story, the Batcave does appear as a downloadable challenge map in Batman: Arkham City. During the main story, Batman is able to access the Batcomputer's database via his batsuit and can upload data to Alfred who can analyze it using the Batcomputer back at the Batcave.

The Batcave is accessible in the main campaign of Batman: Arkham Origins. From the cave the player can use the Batwing fast travel system, switch to alternate skins and enter the challenge map rooms as opposed to selecting from the main menu as in previous Arkham games. Alfred is also present in the cave, supplying Batman with gadget upgrades. The Batcave is heavily damaged by Bane during the game's climax. It is still damaged during the DLC Cold, Cold Heart, set on New Year's Eve, just after the events of the main game.

Although the Batcave is not accessible in Batman: Arkham Knight, Alfred coordinates all activity from it. He also activates the Knightfall Protocol from within the cave using Bruce's voice authorization password "Martha". When Wayne Manor was destroyed after Bruce activates the protocol, it is unknown if the Batcave survived. Throughout the game, both Batman and Robin utilize a Bat-Bunker of sorts underneath Panessa Studios, where Robin works to cure those infected by Joker's blood. The bunker contains holding cells for each infected patient, as well as medical equipment and a Bat-computer.

References

External links
Movie Poop Shoot Article on Batman, including a Batcave section
The Origin of the Bat Cave A blog post by Bill Jourdain about the earliest comics appearances of the Batcave
Top 10 Batcave Trophies Article on ComicsBulletin about the Batcave Hall of Trophies

Gotham City
1943 in comics
Fictional museums
Fictional secret bases
Fictional caves
Fictional elements introduced in 1943